Harold Griffith (21 June 1921 – 6 November 2004) was a Barbadian cricketer. He played in nine first-class matches for the Barbados cricket team from 1943 to 1947.

See also
 List of Barbadian representative cricketers

References

External links
 

1921 births
2004 deaths
Barbadian cricketers
Barbados cricketers
People from Saint Michael, Barbados